A Glass-bottom boat is a type of boat with transparent sections below the waterline.

Glass Bottom Boat may also refer to:

 An activity performed by the coprophilia community where a person defecates on a glass table while another person watches from below
 The Glass Bottom Boat, a 1966 romantic comedy film starring Doris Day and Rod Taylor
 "Glass Bottom Boat", song on 2002 album The Rest of Us by Gas Huffer
"Glass Bottom Boat", song on 1996 The Visualz EP by Siah and Yeshua DapoED
"Glass Bottom Boat", song on 2013 Soothsayer EP by The Fresh & Onlys
 Level It Records/Glass Bottom Boat Music, record company that released music by Janus (American band)